Martha "Marty" Johanna Petronella Laurijsen (born 15 April 1954 in Utrecht) is a former rowing cox from the Netherlands. She won the bronze medal coxing the Women's Eights at the 1984 Summer Olympics in Los Angeles, California, alongside Marieke van Drogenbroek, Lynda Cornet, Greet Hellemans, Nicolette Hellemans, Harriet van Ettekoven, Catharina Neelissen, Anne Quist, and Wiljon Vaandrager.

References
 Dutch Olympic Committee

1954 births
Living people
Dutch female rowers
Olympic rowers of the Netherlands
Rowers at the 1984 Summer Olympics
Olympic bronze medalists for the Netherlands
Sportspeople from Utrecht (city)
Coxswains (rowing)
Olympic medalists in rowing
Medalists at the 1984 Summer Olympics
20th-century Dutch women